The 2013 Grand View Vikings football team was an American football team that represented Grand View University as a member of the Mid-States Football Association (MSFA) during the 2013 NAIA football season. In their sixth season under head coach Mike Woodley, the Vikings compiled a perfect 14–0 record (6–0 against MSFA opponents) and won the NAIA national championship, defeating , 35–23, in the championship game.

The team played its home games at Williams Stadium in Des Moines, Iowa.

Schedule

References

Grand View
Grand View Vikings football seasons
NAIA Football National Champions
College football undefeated seasons
Morningside Mustangs football